Tommy Ho and Sébastien Lareau were the defending champions but only Lareau competed that year with Brian MacPhie.

Lareau and MacPhie lost in the quarterfinals to Joshua Eagle and Andrew Florent.

Martin Damm and Andrei Olhovskiy won in the final 6–4, 7–5 against Patrik Kühnen and Gary Muller.

Seeds

  Martin Damm /  Andrei Olhovskiy (champions)
  David Adams /  Sjeng Schalken (quarterfinals)
  Sébastien Lareau /  Brian MacPhie (quarterfinals)
  Kent Kinnear /  Jonathan Stark (semifinals)

Draw

References
 1996 Salem Open Beijing Doubles Draw

Doubles